Avereest is a former municipality in the Dutch province of Overijssel. The largest town in the municipality was Dedemsvaart.

In 2001, the area became a part of Hardenberg.

Municipalities of the Netherlands disestablished in 2001
Former municipalities of Overijssel
Hardenberg